Yassine El Kharroubi (born 29 March 1990), is a professional footballer who plays as a goalkeeper. Born in France, he is a former player of the Morocco national team.

Club career
El Kharroubi was born in France to parents of Moroccan descent. He began his career at Guingamp, playing only four league games for the senior squad. In 2011, he joined Quevilly. He signed with A PFG team Lokomotiv Plovdiv in the summer of 2015.

On 29 July 2017, El Kharroubi signed a three year contract with Wydad AC. He returned to France in January 2020, signing with Versailles.

International career
In May 2016, El Kharroubi was called up to the Morocco national team for the first time ahead of a friendly against Congo and a 2017 Africa Cup of Nations qualifying match against Libya. On 27 May, against Congo he played full 90 minutes.

In December 2016, El Kharroubi was named in Morocco's 23-man squad for 2017 Africa Cup of Nations, but did not play in any of Morocco's four games at the tournament.

Honours
Quevilly
 Coupe de France runner-up: 2011–12

References

External links

1990 births
Living people
Moroccan footballers
Moroccan expatriate footballers
Morocco international footballers
French footballers
French expatriate footballers
French sportspeople of Moroccan descent
French expatriate sportspeople in Bulgaria
En Avant Guingamp players
US Quevilly-Rouen Métropole players
Football Bourg-en-Bresse Péronnas 01 players
Maghreb de Fès players
FC Vereya players
PFC Lokomotiv Plovdiv players
Wydad AC players
FC Versailles 78 players
First Professional Football League (Bulgaria) players
Second Professional Football League (Bulgaria) players
Botola players
Championnat National players
Championnat National 2 players
Association football goalkeepers
Sportspeople from Dreux
2017 Africa Cup of Nations players
Moroccan expatriate sportspeople in Bulgaria
Expatriate footballers in Bulgaria
Footballers from Centre-Val de Loire